John A. Minko (born January 31, 1953) is an American sports radio and television personality. He was a "20/20 sports anchor" on radio station WFAN in New York City and had worked there from its inception in 1987 until 2020. Nicknamed "Coach" by his coworkers, Minko provides listeners with up-to-the-minute sports news, Sundays through Thursdays between the hours of 10am and 5pm (Monday-Thursday) and 6am and 12pm (Sunday). He has also, at times, been called the "Dean of Updates", a moniker in recognition of his seniority. On April 2nd, 2020, Minko had said that April 3rd was his last day on WFAN.

Minko has been a resident of New Milford, New Jersey.

Broadcasting career
Minko appears with the Mike's On: Francesa on the Fan crew, preceded by Mike and the Mad Dog on the YES Network. which ran from 1989 thru 2014.  Minko is often the butt of jokes made by host Mike Francesa, including false accusations of making critical remarks regarding other members of the radio station or claims that he has boasted about a personal achievement..  He is also teased about his button-down personality and inability to ad-lib during his updates. Joe Benigno credits Minko for teaching him to read at a third-grade level. 

From 2000 to 2009, Minko was the play-by-play voice of Army football on WABC 770 and WEPN. In 2010, he served as co-host of Army football's pre-game show. He also served as the update person for Francesa's nationally syndicated NFL Now show.  More recently, Minko has served as the fill-in radio voice of the New Jersey Nets. Minko also hosted a short-lived 1988 WFAN show, Minko Morning Zoo. His trademark calls are "Bingo!" and "He rings the bell."  Minko is a graduate of Butler University.

John has been the radio play by play announcer for St. John's Red Storm college basketball since November 11, 2008.

Minko also co-hosts a weekly video blog called the Minko Minute with Evan Roberts. They usually talk about whatever Mink wants at first then Evan asks Minko a love question. These so far have only come from a male viewer. The usual response from Minko is to get the woman in question flowers and chocolate. More recently his advice has been to take the woman in question to a nice Broadway show. There have been a few guest appearances including the most recent appearance by Ian Eagle.

References

 

American radio sports announcers
American television sports announcers
Army Black Knights announcers
College football announcers
College basketball announcers in the United States
Butler University alumni
People from New Milford, New Jersey
Radio personalities from New York City
1953 births
Living people